Lake County (formerly known as Aischum County) is a county located in the U.S. state of Michigan. As of the 2020 Census, the population was 12,096. The county seat is Baldwin.

History
The county was created by the Michigan Legislature in 1840 as Aishcum County, then renamed Lake County in 1843, for its many lakes. It was administered by a succession of other Michigan counties prior to the organization of county government in 1871.

Geography

State trunkline highways
 enters from Mason County; goes through Baldwin; continues east into Osceola County
 enters Lake County from Newaygo County; passes through Baldwin; continues north to Wexford County

National Protected Area
 Manistee National Forest (part)

Adjacent counties 
 Osceola County (east)
 Oceana County (southwest)
 Wexford County (northeast)
 Mason County (west)
 Manistee County (northwest)
 Newaygo County (south)
 Mecosta County (southeast)

Demographics

As of the census of 2000, there were 11,333 people, 4,704 households, and 3,052 families residing in the county.  The population density was 20 people per square mile (8/km2).  There were 13,498 housing units at an average density of 24 per square mile (9/km2).  The racial makeup of the county was 84.66% White, 11.17% Black or African American, 1.01% Native American, 0.15% Asian, 0.04% Pacific Islander, 0.57% from other races, and 2.40% from two or more races.  1.69% of the population were Hispanic or Latino of any race. 20.2% were of English ancestry, 20.0% were of German ancestry, 8.4% were of Irish ancestry, and 6.1% were of Dutch ancestry. 97.5% spoke English and 1.3% Spanish as their first language.

There were 4,704 households, out of which 23.00% had children under the age of 18 living with them, 52.40% were married couples living together, 8.70% had a female householder with no husband present, and 35.10% were non-families. 29.60% of all households were made up of individuals, and 13.80% had someone living alone who was 65 years of age or older.  The average household size was 2.28 and the average family size was 2.79.

In the county, the population was spread out, with 21.90% under the age of 18, 8.00% from 18 to 24, 22.70% from 25 to 44, 27.60% from 45 to 64, and 19.70% who were 65 years of age or older.  The median age was 43 years. For every 100 females there were 109.10 males.  For every 100 females age 18 and over, there were 107.60 males.

The median income for a household in the county was $26,622, and the median income for a family was $32,086. Males had a median income of $30,124 versus $21,886 for females. The per capita income for the county was $14,457.  About 14.70% of families and 19.40% of the population were below the poverty line, including 28.30% of those under age 18 and 12.00% of those age 65 or over.  24/7 Wall St. reported that Lake County is the poorest county in Michigan.

Government

The county government operates the jail, maintains rural roads, operates the
major local courts, keeps files of deeds and mortgages, maintains vital records, administers
public health regulations, and participates with the state in the provision of welfare and
other social services. The county board of commissioners controls the
budget but has only limited authority to make laws or ordinances.  In Michigan, most local
government functions — police and fire, building and zoning, tax assessment, street
maintenance, etc. — are the responsibility of individual cities and townships.

Elected officials
 Chief Trial Court Judge:  Mark S. Wickens
 Prosecuting Attorney: Craig Cooper
 Sheriff: Richard L. Martin
 County Clerk/Register of Deeds: Patti Pacola
 County Treasurer: Kellie Allen
 County Surveyor: Patrick Johnson

(information as of December 2016)

Communities

Villages
 Baldwin (county seat)
 Luther

Townships

 Chase
 Cherry Valley
 Dover
 Eden
 Elk
 Ellsworth
 Lake
 Newkirk
 Peacock
 Pinora
 Pleasant Plains
 Sauble
 Sweetwater
 Webber
 Yates

Other unincorporated communities
 Branch (partially)
 Chase
 Idlewild
 Irons
 Peacock
 Sauble
 Wolf Lake

See also
 List of Michigan State Historic Sites in Lake County, Michigan
National Register of Historic Places listings in Lake County, Michigan

References

External links
Lake County Road Commission Website

Lake County Website
Lake County Chamber of Commerce

 
Michigan counties
1871 establishments in Michigan